St. Gallen, or traditionally in English St Gall, is a Swiss city and the capital of the canton of St. Gallen. It evolved from the hermitage of Saint Gall, founded in the 7th century. Today, it is a large urban agglomeration (with around 167,000 inhabitants in 2019) and represents the center of eastern Switzerland. Its economy consists mainly of the service sector. The city is home to the University of St. Gallen, one of the best business schools in Europe.

The main tourist attraction is the Abbey of Saint Gall, a UNESCO World Heritage Site. The Abbey's renowned library contains books from the 9th century. The official language of St. Gallen is (the Swiss variety of Standard) German, but the main spoken language is the local variant of the Alemannic Swiss German dialect. The city has good transport links to the rest of the country and to neighbouring Germany and Austria. It also functions as the gate to the Appenzellerland.

History

Early history

The town of St. Gallen grew around the Abbey of St Gall, founded in the 8th century. The abbey is said to have been built at the site of the hermitage of Irish missionary Gallus, who according to legend had established himself by the river Steinach in AD 612. The monastery itself was founded by Saint Othmar in c. 720. The abbey prospered in the 9th century and became a site of pilgrimage and a center of trade, with associated guest houses, stables and other facilities, a hospital, one of the first monastery schools north of the Alps. By the tenth century, a settlement had grown up around the abbey.

In 926 Magyar raiders attacked the abbey and surrounding town. Saint Wiborada, the first woman formally canonized by the Vatican, reportedly saw a vision of the impending attack and warned the monks and citizens to flee. While the monks and the abbey treasure escaped, Wiborada chose to stay behind and was killed by the raiders.
Between 924 and 933 the Magyars again threatened the abbey, and its books were removed for safekeeping to Reichenau. Not all the books were returned.

On 26 April 937 a fire consumed much of the abbey, spreading to the adjoining settlement. However, the library was spared. About 954 a protective wall was raised around the abbey. By 975, Abbot Notker finished the wall, and the adjoining settlement began growing into the town of St. Gall.

Independence from the Abbey
From the later 12th century, the town of St. Gall increasingly pushed for independence from the abbey. In 1180, an imperial reeve, who was not answerable to the abbot, was installed in the town.
 
In 1207, Abbot Ulrich von Sax was granted the rank of Imperial Prince (Reichsfürst) by Philip of Swabia, King of the Germans. As an ecclesiastical principality, the Abbey of St. Gallen was to constitute an important territorial state and a major regional power in northern Switzerland.

The city of St. Gallen proper progressively freed itself from the rule of the abbot. Abbot Wilhelm von Montfort in 1291 granted special privileges to the citizens. By about 1353 the guilds, headed by the cloth-weavers guild, had gained control of the civic government. In 1415 the city bought its liberty from the German king Sigismund.

Ally of the Swiss Confederacy
In 1405, the Appenzell estates of the abbot successfully rebelled and in 1411 they became allies of the Old Swiss Confederation. A few months later, the town of St. Gallen also became an ally. They joined the "everlasting alliance" as full members of the Confederation in 1454 and in 1457 became completely free from the abbot.

However, in 1451 the abbey became an ally of Zurich, Lucerne, Schwyz, and Glarus who were all members of the Confederation.

Ulrich Varnbüler was an early mayor of St. Gallen and perhaps one of the most colorful. Hans, the father of Ulrich, was prominent in city affairs in St. Gallen in the early 15th century. Ulrich entered public affairs in the early 1460s and attained the various offices and honours that are available to a talented and ambitious man. He demonstrated fine qualities as field commander of the St. Gallen troops in the Burgundian Wars.

In the Battle of Grandson (1476) his troops were part of the advance units of the Confederation and took part in their famous attack. A large painting of Ulrich returning triumphantly to a hero's welcome in St. Gallen is still displayed in St. Gallen.

After the war, Varnbüler often represented St. Gallen at the various parliaments of the Confederation. In December 1480, Varnbüler was offered the position of mayor for the first time. From that time on, he served in several leadership positions and was considered the city's intellectual and political leader.

According to Vadian, who understood his contemporaries well, "Ulrich was a very intelligent, observant, and eloquent man who enjoyed the trust of the citizenry to a high degree."

His reputation among the Confederates was also substantial. However, in the late 1480s, he became involved in a conflict that was to have serious negative consequences for him and for the city.

In 1463, Ulrich Rösch had assumed the management of the abbey of Saint Gall. He was an ambitious prelate, whose goal was to return the abbey to prominence by every possible means, following the losses of the Appenzell War.

His restless ambition offended the political and material interests of his neighbours. When he arranged for the help of the Pope and the Emperor to carry out a plan to move the abbey to Rorschach on Lake Constance, he encountered stiff resistance from the St. Gallen citizenry, other clerics, and the Appenzell nobility in the Rhine Valley, who were concerned for their holdings.

At this point, Varnbüler entered the conflict against the prelate. He wanted to restrain the increase of the abbey's power and at the same time increase the power of the town that had been restricted in its development. For this purpose he established contact with farmers and Appenzell residents (led by the fanatical Hermann Schwendiner) who were seeking an opportunity to weaken the abbot.

Initially, he protested to the abbot and the representatives of the four sponsoring Confederate cantons (Zurich, Lucerne, Schwyz, and Glarus) against the construction of the new abbey in Rorschach. Then on 28 July 1489 he had armed troops from St. Gallen and Appenzell destroy the buildings already under construction, an attack known as the Rorschacher Klosterbruch.

When the Abbot complained to the Confederates about the damage and demanded full compensation, Ulrich responded with a countersuit, and in cooperation with Schwendiner rejected the arbitration efforts of the non-partisan Confederates. He motivated the clerics from Wil to Rorschach to abandon their loyalty to the abbey and spoke against the abbey at a meeting of the townspeople at Waldkirch, where the popular league was formed. He was confident that the four sponsoring cantons would not intervene with force, due to the prevailing tensions between the Confederation and the Swabian League. He was strengthened in his resolve when the people of St. Gallen re-elected him as their highest magistrate in 1490.

Invasion of 1490
Ulrich Varnbüler had made a serious miscalculation. In early 1490, the four cantons decided to carry out their duty to the abbey and to invade the St. Gallen canton with an armed force. The people of Appenzell and the local clerics submitted to this force without significant resistance, while the city of St. Gallen braced itself for a fight to the finish. However, when they learned that their compatriots had given up the fight, they lost confidence, and they agreed to a settlement that greatly restricted the city's power and burdened the city with serious penalties and reparation payments.

Ulrich, overwhelmed by the responsibility for his political decisions, panicked in the face of the approaching enemy who wanted him apprehended. His life was in great danger, and he was forced to escape from the city disguised as a messenger. He made his way to Lindau and to Innsbruck and the court of King Maximilian. The victors confiscated those of his properties that lay outside of the city of St. Gallen and banned him from the Confederation. Ulrich then appealed to the imperial court (as did Schwendiner, who had fled with him) for the return of his property.

The suit had the support of Friedrich II and Maximilian and the trial threatened to drag on for years: it was continued by Ulrich's sons Hans and Ulrich after his death in 1496, and eventually the Varnbülers regained their properties. However, other political ramifications resulted from the court action, because the Confederation gained ownership of the city of St. Gallen and rejected the inroads of the empire. Thus, the conflict strengthened the relationship between the Confederation and the city of St. Gallen. On the other hand, the matter deepened the alienation between Switzerland and the German Holy Roman Empire, which eventually led to a total separation after the Swabian War.

Despite the unpropitious end of his career, Ulrich Varnbüler is immortalized in a famous woodcut by Albrecht Dürer, which is now part of the Smithsonian Institution's woodcut collection in the National Gallery of Art, Washington, DC.

Among Varnbüler's sons, the eldest (Hans/Johann) became the mayor of Lindau. He is the patriarch of the Baden and Württemberg Varnbülers.

Reformation
Starting in 1526 then-mayor and humanist Joachim von Watt (Vadian) introduced the Protestant Reformation into St. Gallen. The town converted to the new religion while the abbey remained Roman Catholic. While iconoclastic riots forced the monks to flee the city and remove images from the city's churches, the fortified abbey remained untouched. The abbey would remain a Catholic stronghold in the Protestant city until 1803.

Modern history
In 1798 Napoleon invaded the Old Swiss Confederation, destroying the Ancien Régime. Under the Helvetic Republic both the abbey and the city lost their power and were combined with Appenzell into the Canton of Säntis. The Helvetic Republic was widely unpopular in Switzerland and was overthrown in 1803. Following the Act of Mediation the city of St. Gallen became the capital of the Protestant Canton of St. Gallen.

One of the first acts of the new canton was to suppress the abbey. The monks were driven from the abbey; the last abbot died in Muri in 1829. In 1846 a rearrangement in the local dioceses made St. Gall a separate diocese, with the abbey church as its cathedral and a portion of the monastic buildings designated the bishop's residence.

Gustav Adolf IV, former king of Sweden, spent the last years of his life in St. Gallen, and died there in 1837.

In the 15th century, St. Gallen became known for producing quality textiles. In 1714, the zenith was reached with a yearly production of 38,000 pieces of cloth. The first depression occurred in the middle of the 18th century, caused by strong foreign competition and reforms in methods of cotton production. But St. Gallen recovered and an even more prosperous era arrived.

At the beginning of the 19th century, the first embroidery machines were developed in St. Gallen. In 1910 the embroidery production constituted the largest export branch (18% of the total export value) in Switzerland and more than half of the worldwide production of embroidery originated in St. Gallen. One fifth of the population of the eastern part of Switzerland was involved with the textile industry. However, World War I and the Great Depression caused another severe crisis for St. Gallen embroidery. Only in the 1950s did the textile industry recover somewhat. Nowadays, because of competition and the prevalence of computer-operated embroidery machines, only a reduced textile industry has survived in St. Gallen; but its embroidered textiles are still popular with Parisian haute couture designers.

Geography and climate

Topography
It is one of the highest cities in Switzerland and thus receives abundant winter snow. The city lies between Lake Constance and the mountains of the Appenzell Alps (with the Säntis as the highest peak at ). It therefore offers excellent recreation areas nearby.

As the city center is built on an unstable turf ground (its founder Gallus was looking for a site for a hermitage, not for a city), all buildings on the valley floor must be built on piles. For example, the entire foundation of the train station and its plaza are based on hundreds of piles.

Of this area, 27.7% is used for agricultural purposes, while 28.2% is forested. Of the rest of the land, 42.1% is settled (buildings or roads) and the remainder (1.9%) is non-productive (rivers or lakes).

Climate
St. Gallen has a humid continental climate (Dfb) with short, warm summers and long, moderately cold winters. Precipitation is very high year round. St. Gallen has a very cloudy climate.

Between 1981 and 2010 St. Gallen had an average of 141 days of rain or snow per year and on average received  of precipitation. During this month there was precipitation for an average of 13.8 days. The month with the most days of precipitation were June and July May.

Radioactivity
St. Gallen is notable for reporting the highest maximum radioactivity measurements of any Swiss city, as published in the 2009 yearly report by the Federal Office of Public Health. While the daily average level of gamma-ray radioactivity in the city is unremarkable at 105 nSv/h, the maximum can reach 195 nSv/h, as high as the average for Jungfraujoch, the location with the highest reported level of radioactivity in Switzerland, due to its high elevation and therefore greater exposure to cosmic rays. The same report explains that the unusually high spikes of radioactivity measured in St. Gallen are due to radioactive products of radon gas being washed to the ground during heavy storms, but does not explain where the sufficient quantities of radon gas and its products to account for the anomaly would come from. The yearly report for 2009 on risks associated with radon published by the same governmental agency shows St. Gallen to lie in an area of the lowest level of radon exposure. In addition to the measured gamma-radiation, the city may be subject to radioactive tritium pollution in Teufen, a satellite town situated 4 km south of the city in the canton of Appenzell Outer Rhodes (this pollution is also covered in the report).

Politics

Coat of arms
The blazon of the municipal coat of arms is Argent a Bear rampant Sable langued and in his virility Gules and armed and gorged Or.

Subdivisions

Government
The City Council (Stadtrat) constitutes the executive government of the City of St. Gallen and operates as a collegiate authority. It is composed of five councilors, each presiding over a directorate. The president of the presidential directorate acts as mayor (Stadtpräsident). In the mandate period 2017–2020 (Legislatur) the City Council is presided by Stadtpräsidentin Maria Pappa. Departmental tasks, coordination measures and implementation of laws decreed by the City Parliament are carried by the City Council. The regular election of the City Council by any inhabitant valid to vote is held every four years. Any resident of St. Gallen allowed to vote can be elected as a member of the City Council. The current mandate period is from 1 January 2021 to 31 December 2024. The mayor is elected as such by public election by means of a system of Majorz, while the heads of the other directorates are assigned by the collegiate. The delegates are elected by means of a system of Majorz.

, St. Gallen's City Council is made up of two representatives of the SP (Social Democratic Party) of which one is the mayor, one member of the FDP (FDP.The Liberals), one of the GLP (Green Liberal Party), and one independent. The last regular election was held on 27 September 2020.

Manfred Linke is City Chancellor (Stadtschreiber) since for the City Chancellary.

Parliament

The City Parliament (Stadtparlament) holds legislative power. It is made up of 63 members, with elections held every four years. The City Parliament decrees regulations and by-laws that are executed by the City Council and the administration. The delegates are selected by means of a system of proportional representation (Proporz).

The sessions of the City Parliament are public. Unlike members of the City Council, members of the City Parliament are not politicians by profession, and they are paid a fee based on their attendance. Any resident of St. Gallen allowed to vote can be elected as a member of the City Parliament. The parliament holds its meetings in the Waaghaus once a week on Tuesdays.

The last regular election of the City Parliament was held on 27 September 2020 for the mandate period from January 2021 to December 2024. Currently the City Parliament consists of 17 members of the Social Democratic Party (SP/PS) and one of its junior section, the JUSO, 11 The Liberals (FDP/PLR), 8 Green Liberal Party (GLP/PVL), 8 Christian Democratic People's Party (CVP/PDC), 8 Swiss People's Party (SVP/UDC), 7 Green Party (GPS/PES) and 1 of its junior section, the JungeGr, one representative of the Evangelical People's Party (EVP), and one member of the Politische Frauengruppe (PFG) (Political Women Group).

National elections

National Council

In the 2019 federal election for the Swiss National Council the most popular party was the PS which received 24.4% (-3.8) of the vote. The next five most popular parties were the Green Party (17.5%, +8.3), the SVP (16.5%, -4.6), FDP (14.4%, +0.1), the CVP (12.6%, +0.4), and the GLP (10.9%, +4.4). In the federal election a total of 18,821 votes were cast, and the voter turnout was 42.9%.

In the 2015 election for the Swiss National Council the most popular party was the SPS which received 28.1% of the vote. The next five most popular parties were the SVP (21.1%), the FDP (14.3%), the CVP (12.2%), the GPS (9.2%), and the GLP (6.6%). In the federal election, a total of 20,768 voters were cast, and the voter turnout was 46.0%.

International relations 

St. Gallen is twinned with:

Demographics

Population

, about 31.4% of the population was made up of foreign nationals. The population has grown at 4.4% per year. Most of the population speaks German (83.0%), with Italian being second most common (3.7%) and Serbo-Croatian being third (3.7%). Of the Swiss national languages, 60,297 speak German, 575 people speak French, 2,722 people speak Italian, and 147 people speak Romansh.

The age distribution, in St. Gallen is: 6,742 (9.3%) between 0 and 9 years old; 7,595 (10.5%) between 10 and 19; 12,574 (17.3%) between 20 and 29; 11,735 (16.2%) between 30 and 39; 9,535 (13.1%) between 40 and 49; 8,432 (11.6%) between 50 and 59; 6,461 (8.9%) between 60 and 69; 5,633 (7.8%) between 70 and 79; 3,255 (4.5%) between 80 and 89; 655 (0.9%) between 90 and 99; 9 people (0.0%) aged 100 or more.

 there were 16,166 people (22.3%) who were living alone in private dwellings; 17,137 (or 23.6%) who were part of a couple (married or otherwise committed) without children, and 27,937 (or 38.5%) who were part of a couple with children. There were 4,533 (or 6.2%) people who lived in single parent home, while there are 419 persons who were adult children living with one or both parents, 475 persons who lived in a household made up of relatives, 2,296 who lived household made up of unrelated persons, and 3,663 who are either institutionalized or live in another type of collective housing.

Historical population
The historical population is given in the following table:

Economy
, St. Gallen had an unemployment rate of 2.69%. , there were 336 people employed in the primary economic sector and about 95 businesses involved in this sector. 11,227 people are employed in the secondary sector and there are 707 businesses in this sector. 48,729 people are employed in the tertiary sector, with 4,035 businesses in this sector.  the average unemployment rate was 4.5%. There were 4857 businesses in the municipality of which 689 were involved in the secondary sector of the economy while 4102 were involved in the third.  there were 28,399 residents who worked in the municipality, while 8,927 residents worked outside St. Gallen and 31,543 people commuted into the municipality for work.

Helvetia Insurance is a major company headquartered in St. Gallen.

Religion
Of the rest of the population, there are 112 individuals (or about 0.15% of the population) who belong to the Christian Catholic faith, there are 3,253 individuals (or about 4.48% of the population) who belong to the Orthodox Church, and there are 1,502 individuals (or about 2.07% of the population) who belong to another Christian church. There are 133 individuals (or about 0.18% of the population) who are Jewish, and 4,856 (or about 6.69% of the population) who are Muslim. There are 837 individuals (or about 1.15% of the population) who belong to another church (not listed on the census), 7,221 (or about 9.94% of the population) belong to no church, are agnostic or atheist, and 3,156 individuals (or about 4.35% of the population) did not answer the question.

Education

St. Gallen is known for its business school, now named the University of St. Gallen (HSG). It was ranked as the top business school in Europe by Wirtschaftswoche, a weekly German business news magazine and is highly ranked by several other sources. Recently, HSG has been building a reputation for Executive Education, with its International MBA recognised as one of Europe's leading programmes, and runs a PhD programme. HSG is a focused university that offers degrees in business and management, economics, political science and international relations as well as business law. The Master in Management course was Ranked number 1 in 2014 by The Financial Times ahead of HEC Paris. It is comparatively small, with about 6,500 students enrolled at present, has both EQUIS and AACSB accreditations, and is a member of CEMS (Community of European Management Schools). The university maintains student and faculty exchange programs around the world. The University of St. Gallen is also famous for its high density of clubs. Particularly well known is the International Students’ Committee, which has organised the St. Gallen Symposium for over forty years. The St. Gallen Symposium is the leading student-run economic conference of its kind worldwide and aims to foster the dialogue between generations.

St. Gallen's state school system contains 64 kindergartens, 21 primary schools and 7 secondary schools and about 6,800 students. In addition to the state system, St. Gallen is home to the Institut auf dem Rosenberg — an élite boarding school attracting students from all over the world. The Institut provides an education in English, German and Italian and prepares the students to enter: American, British, Swiss, Italian, German and other European university programmes.

The canton's Gewerbliches Berufs- und Weiterbildungszentrum is the largest occupational school in Switzerland with over 10,000 students and various specialty institutes. One for example, the GBS Schule für Gestaltung teaches students design fundamentals in the practice of graphic design. The school is located in Riethüsli, a small section of the city of St. Gallen.

In St. Gallen about 68.8% of the population (between age 25–64) have completed either non-mandatory upper secondary education or additional higher education (either university or a Fachhochschule). Out of the total population in St. Gallen, the highest education level completed by 15,035 people (20.7% of the population) was Primary, while 27,465 (37.8%) have completed their secondary education, 10,249 (14.1%) have attended a Tertiary school, and 2,910 (4.0%) are not in school. The remainder did not answer this question.

Culture and sightseeing

After the years of Gallus' death, the place became one of the centers of Germanic culture. This is because of the creative works of the monks who followed the footsteps of the city's founder Gallus. This resulted to numerous heritage sites of national significance of the country.

In 1992, St. Gallen was awarded the Wakker Prize for the city's effort to create a unified structure and appearance in current and future construction.

Heritage sites of national significance
There are 28 sites in St. Gallen that are listed as Swiss heritage sites of national significance, including four religious buildings; the Abbey of St. Gallen, the former Dominican Abbey of St. Katharina, the Reformed Church of St. Laurenzenkirche and the Roman Catholic parish church of St. Maria Neudorf.

There are six museums or archives in the inventory. This includes the Textile museum, the Historical and ethnographical museum, the Cantonal library and city archives, the Art and Natural History museum, the Museum in Lagerhaus and the St. Gallen State Archive. The entire city of St. Gallen is the only archeological heritage site. Two bridges are listed, the Eisenbahnbrücke BT (railroad bridge) and the Kräzern-Strassenbrücke with a custom house.

The twelve other sites include the main train station, main post office, University of St. Gallen, Cantonal School, City Theatre and two towers; the Lokremise with Wasserturm and the Tröckneturm.

Theatre
 In the modern and somewhat extravagant building of the Theater St. Gallen operas, operettas, ballet, musicals and plays are performed. It has an average utilization of nearly 80 percent.
 Since 2006 a series of open-air operas have been performed in front of the Cathedral starting around the last weekend of June.
 In the nearby concert hall, Tonhalle St. Gallen, with its grand art nouveau style, all sorts of concerts (classic, symphony, jazz etc.) are given.

Museums
 Historical and ethnographical museum (collections of regional early history, city history, folk art, cultural history as well ethnographical collections from all over the world)
 Art museum (painting and sculptures from the 19th and 20th century)
 St. Gallen art gallery (national and international modern art)
 Natural history museum (natural history collection)
 Museum in the storehouse (Swiss native art and art brut)
 Textile museum (historical laces, embroidery and cloth)
 Lapidarium of the abbey (building blocks from 8th to 17th century)
 Point Jaune museum (Mail Art, Postpostism, 'Pataphysics)
 Beer bottle museum (located at the Schützengarten brewery—the oldest brewery in Switzerland)

Music
 The symphony orchestra St. Gallen performs as the Orchestra of the City Theatre, presents numerous symphony concerts in the City Concert Hall.
 During the summer open-air opera and various concerts are performed at numerous locations in town.
 The well known St. Gallen Open Air Festival takes place in the nearby Sitter Valley the first weekend in July.
 St. Gallen is home to the Nordklang Festival, which takes place in February.

Buildings
 Drei Weieren (three artificial water basins from the zenith of the textile industry with art nouveau-bath houses; reachable by the Mühleggbahn (train) from 1893). The Drei Weieren is a water park by day and a gathering place for young people by night. This results in many complaints by people who live in the vicinity about noise, drug abuse and vandalism. Locals jokingly call the three basins "Lakes with the most THC in the country". The young people who spend their time there claim that the Drei Weieren is a place where they can spend their time in a consumer-free environment.
 Convent of St. Gall with the famous library and abbey (UNESCO World Heritage Site)
 Greek Orthodox Church of St.Constantine and Helena, Athonite icons and a stained glass window of the Last Judgement.
 Wegelin & Co., the oldest bank in Switzerland, founded in 1741
 Tröckneturm Schönenwegen; the tower was built 1828 and was used to hang up freshly colored cloth panels for drying.
 Protestant church Linsebühl, an impressive new renaissance building dating from 1897
 University of St. Gallen (HSG; University for Business Administration, Economics and Law with an excellent reputation in the German-speaking world), founded 1898.
 Embroidery exchange, splendid building with the god of trade Hermes on its roof.
 Volksbad, the oldest public bathhouse still in operation in Switzerland dating from 1908.
 Catholic church of St. Martin in the Bruggen district; the concrete church built in 1936 was at that time glaringly modern.
 1992 the city of St. Gallen received the Wakker Prize.
 Stadtlounge (City Lounge) – a pedestrian area in the city center designed to represent a lounge room, but in the street.
 Synagogue St. Gallen – Built by the architects Chiodera and Tschudy, it is the only synagogue in the Lake Constance region that has been preserved in its original state.

Parks
 Wildlife park Peter and Paul
 City park at the theater
 Cantonal school park

Regular events
 The St. Gallen Symposium attracts about 600 personalities from economics, science, politics and society to the University of St. Gallen every year. It hosts the world's largest student essay competition of its kind with about 1,000 participants, of whom the 100 best contributions are selected to participate in the St. Gallen Symposium. The Symposium celebrated its 40th anniversary in May 2010.
 OLMA, traditional Swiss Fair for Agriculture and Nutrition in autumn as well as numerous other exhibitions at the OLMA Fairs St. Gallen.
 OpenAir St. Gallen is an annual open air festival in the Sitter Valley.
 Children's Feast, a triennial observance, originally a product of the textile industry.
 Nordklang Festival takes place in multiple sites around St. Gallen.

Sport

 The football club FC St. Gallen play in the Swiss Super League. They are the oldest football club in Switzerland and oldest in continental Europe, founded in 1879. Their stadium is the kybunpark.
 The football club SC Brühl play in the 1. Liga Promotion. Their stadium is the Paul-Grüninger-Stadion.
 EHC St. Gallen plays in the Swiss Second League, the fourth tier of Swiss ice hockey.
 The Rugby Club St. Gallen Bishops (Men) was founded in 1990 and Cindies (Women) in 2014. They play at the Grundenmoos sports fields.

Transportation
The large urban area Zurich is 80 km south-west of St. Gallen, a 60-minute drive or train ride (ICN train).

Road transportation 
The A1 motorway links St. Gallen with St. Margrethen, Zurich, Bern and Geneva. In 1987 the city motorway was opened, which conveys the traffic through two tunnels (Rosenberg and Stefanshorn) almost directly below the city center.

Air transportation 
The Airport St. Gallen-Altenrhein, near Lake of Constance, provides scheduled airline flights to Vienna and other destinations.

Public transport

By rail and tram 

St. Gallen railway station is part of the national Swiss Federal Railways network and has InterCity connections to Zurich and the Zurich Airport every half-hour. St. Gallen is the hub for many private railways such as the Südostbahn (SOB), connecting St. Gallen with Lucerne, the Appenzeller Bahnen, which operates the Appenzell–St. Gallen–Trogen railway, connecting to Appenzell and Trogen, and also serves as a tram in downtown.

By bus 
The city has a dense local bus system, including the city's trolleybus network, which is operated by the VBSG and is well established on the valley floor, but less so on the hills. As St. Gallen is located near the Appenzell mountain area, it offers also many Postauto (post bus) connections. The agglomeration also has its own St. Gallen S-Bahn system (overground local trains).

Expansion - St. Gallen 2013 

The "St. Gallen 2013" project aimed to improve local rail services, with infrastructure upgrades and new rolling stock. By December 2013, S-Bahn services would run on six lines, at intervals of 15 to 30 minutes.

Notable people

Early times 
 Joachim Vadian (1484–1551), a Swiss humanist, scholar, mayor and reformer in St. Gallen
 Johannes Zollikofer (1633–1692), a Swiss reformed vicar
 Georg Gsell (1673–1740), a Baroque painter, art consultant and art dealer
 Michael Schlatter (1716–1790), an American German Reformed clergyman 
 Rev. John Joachim Zubly (1724–1781), a Swiss-born American pastor, planter and statesman during the American Revolution
 Adrian Zingg (1734–1816), painter, draftsman, etcher, engraver
 Prof Christopher Girtanner FRSE (1760–1800), a short-lived but influential Swiss author, physician and chemist
 Johann Baptist Isenring (1796–1860), a landscape painter, printer and Daguerrotypist

19th century 
 Gall Morel (1803–1872), a poet, scholar, aesthete and educationist
 Arnold Otto Aepli (1816–1897), a jurist and statesman, President of the Swiss Council of States 1868–1869
 Johann Jakob Weilenmann (1819–1896), a mountaineer and Alpine writer, made many first ascents in the Alps
 Karl Hoffmann (1820–1895), a politician, President of the Swiss Council of States, 1877–1878 and 1889–1890
 Ernst Götzinger (1837–1896), a Germanist and historian
 Alphonse Bory (1838–1891), a politician, President of the Swiss Council of States 1886–1887
 Johannes Dierauer (1842–1920), an historian and librarian of the Stadtbibliothek Vadiana
 Samuel Oettli (1846–1911), a Protestant theologian, specialized in Old Testament studies
 Adolf Schlatter (1852–1938), a Protestant theologian and professor of the New Testament
 Arthur Hoffmann (1857–1927), a politician and member of the Swiss Federal Council 1911–1917
 Robert Emden (1862–1940), an astrophysicist and meteorologist
 Julius Billeter (1869–1957), a genealogist and Mormon missionary
 Ernst Rüdin (1874–1952), a German psychiatrist, geneticist, eugenicist and Nazi
 Martha Cunz (1876–1961), an artist and printmaker, mastered the modernist woodcut
 Joseph Joos (1878–1965), a German intellectual, politician and MP in Weimar, lived in St Gallen 1960-1965 
 Franz Riklin (1878–1938), a psychiatrist, worked with Carl Gustav Jung
 Otto Schlaginhaufen (1879–1973), an anthropologist, ethnologist and eugenicist
 Heinrich Greinacher (1880–1974), a physicist, developed the magnetron and the Greinacher multiplier
 Fritz Platten (1883–1942), a Swiss Communist, the main organizer of Lenin's return trip to Russia from exile in Switzerland
 Regina Ullmann (1884–1961), a poet and storyteller
 Paul Scherrer (1890–1969), a physicist, proponent of Switzerland developing its own nuclear weapons
 Karl Kobelt (1891–1968), politician, President of the Confederation in 1946 and 1952
 Paul Grüninger (1891–1972), police captain, now recognized as one of the Righteous Among the Nations as he saved about 3,600 Jewish refugees by backdating their visas, for which he was sacked
 Charles Stoffel (1893–1970), a sportsman, competed in the 1924 and 1928 Winter Olympics and the 1924 and 1928 Summer Olympics
 Walter Mittelholzer (1894–1937), an aviation pioneer, pilot, photographer and travel writer
 Ottó Misángyi (1895–1977), a Hungarian athletics coach, sports official and university professor
 Thomas Holenstein (1896–1962), politician, member of the Swiss Federal Council 1955–1959

20th century 

 Jolanda Neff (born 1993), an olympian, cross-country cyclist
 Berta Rahm (1910–1998), an architect, writer, publisher and feminist activist
 Bärbel Inhelder (1913–1997), a psychologist and epistemologist particularly regards child development
 Peter Maag (1919–2001), a conductor
 Walter Roderer (1920–2012), an actor and screenwriter 
 Kevin Fiala (1996 – present), an NHL player for the Los Angeles Kings
 Kurt Furgler (1924–2008) a politician, member of the Swiss Federal Council 1972–1986
 Fred Iklé (1924–2011) a sociologist and defense expert in the US defense policy establishment
 Fred Hayman (1925–2016) an American fashion retailer and entrepreneur
 Hansrudi Wäscher (1928–2016) a Swiss-German comics artist and comics author
 Peter Hildebrand Meienberg (1929–2021) a Swiss Benedictine Missionary based in East Africa
 Ines Torelli (born 1931) a comedian, radio personality and stage, voice and film actress 
 Max Meier (born 1936) a boxer, competed in the men's welterweight at the 1960 Summer Olympics
 Hugo Tschirky (born 1938) a scientist, studies management science, technology management and innovation study
 Hans Eugen Frischknecht (born 1939), a composer and organist
 Niklaus Meienberg (1940–1993) a writer and investigative journalist
 Ruth Dreifuss (born 1940) a politician, member of the Swiss Federal Council 1993–2002 
 Dieter Mobius (1944–2015) a German electronic musician and composer
 Daniel Thürer (born 1945), a jurist and law professor 
 Karl Ammann (born 1948), a conservationist and wildlife photographer in the Congo basin
 Josef Flammer (born 1948), an ophthalmologist.
 Paola del Medico (born 1950) a singer, she sang for Switzerland in the 1969 and 1980 Eurovision Song Contest
 Christophe Boesch (born 1951), a primatologist who studies chimpanzees
 Peter Liechti (1951–2014) a movie director 
 René Tinner (born 1953) a recording engineer and producer 
 Hans Fässler (born 1954) an historian, politician, satirical revue artist, political activist and teacher of English
 Simone Drexel (born 1957) a singer and songwriter,  she sang for Switzerland in the 1975 Eurovision Song Contest
 Susan Boos (born 1963) a journalist, writes on nuclear and energy policy
 Michael Hengartner (born 1966) a Swiss-Canadian biochemist and molecular biologist
 Prince Maximilian of Liechtenstein (born 1969) CEO of the LGT Group
 Monika Fischer (born 1971) with Mathias Braschler is a photographer of portrait projects
 Marco Zwyssig (born 1971), a retired football defender, 302 club caps and 20 for the national team
 Aurelia Frick (born 1975), a Liechtensteiner politician, the current Minister of Foreign Affairs, Education and Culture. 
 David Philip Hefti (born 1975), a composer and conductor
 Dominik Meichtry (born 1984), a competitive middle distance freestyle swimmer
 Tranquillo Barnetta (born 1985), a professional footballer, nearly 500 team caps and 75 for the national team
 Nevin Galmarini (born 1986), a snowboarder, gold medallist at the 2018 Winter Olympics
 Linda Fäh (born 1987), a model and beauty pageant titleholder, Miss Switzerland 2009

See also
 List of mayors of St. Gallen

Notes and references

External links
 
 
 St. Gallen Symposium

 QuickTime Virtual Reality (QTVR) images of St. Gallen
 University of St Gallen
 

 
Cities in Switzerland
Cantonal capitals of Switzerland
Saint Gallen
Saint Gallen
Saint Gallen
Saint Gallen
States and territories established in 1401
Cultural property of national significance in the canton of St. Gallen
States and territories disestablished in 1648